Langemak Bay (Langemark, Langemaak) is a bay north of Finschhafen, on the north east coast of Papua New Guinea.  Langemak Bay saw extensive naval operations in World War II, including a landing beach at the western end of the bay for the embarkation of the 2/24th Australian Infantry Battalion.  The US Navy built Naval Base Finschhafen in 1943.

References

External links
youtube, Battle for New Guinea 1942-1945 

Bays of Papua New Guinea